The Isdal Woman (1930–1945 – November 1970) is a placeholder name given to an unidentified woman who was found dead at Isdalen ("The Ice Valley") in Bergen, Norway, on 29 November 1970.

Although police at the time ruled a verdict of likely suicide, the nature of the case encouraged speculation and ongoing investigation in the years since. Half a century later, it remains one of the most profound Cold War mysteries in Norwegian history.

Discovery 

On the afternoon of 29 November 1970, a man and his two young daughters were hiking in the foothills of the north face of Ulriken, in an area known as Isdalen ("The Ice Valley"); it was also nicknamed "Dødsdalen" ("The Death Valley") due to the area's history of suicides in the Middle Ages, and a more recent string of hiking accidents.

Noting an unusual burning smell, one of the daughters located the charred body of a woman located among some scree. Surprised and fearful, the group returned to town to notify the police.

Investigation 
Bergen Police responded quickly and launched a full-scale investigation (filed as case name "134/70"). Examining the site, police noted the woman's supine position, her clenched hands up by her torso, and the absence of a nearby campfire. The front of her body and her clothes had been severely burned and she was unrecognisable. Also located or placed near the body, and affected by the fire, were: an empty bottle of St. Hallvard liqueur, two plastic water bottles, a plastic passport container, rubber boots, a woolen jumper, a scarf, nylon stockings, an umbrella, a purse, a matchbox, a watch, two earrings, and a ring. Around the body were traces of burned paper, and beneath it was a fur hat which was later found to have traces of petrol. All identifying marks and labels on these items had been removed or rubbed off.

Three days later, investigators found two suitcases belonging to the woman at Bergen railway station. In the lining of one, police discovered five 100 Deutsche Mark notes ( US$137 in 1970). Among other items, they found clothing, shoes, wigs, makeup, eczema cream, 135 Norwegian kroner, Belgian, British and Swiss coins, maps, timetables, a pair of glasses (with non-prescription lenses), sunglasses (with partial fingerprints that matched the body), cosmetics, and a notepad. As with the body, any possible identifying information had been removed.

An autopsy at the Gades Institutt concluded the woman had died from a combination of incapacitation by phenobarbital and poisoning by carbon monoxide. Soot was found in her lungs, indicating she was alive as she burned, and her neck was bruised, possibly from a fall or by a blow. Analysis of her blood and stomach showed that she had consumed between 50 and 70 Fenemal brand sleeping pills, and found next to her body were a further 12 sleeping pills. At autopsy, her teeth and jaw were removed due to her unique gold-filling dental work, and tissue samples of her organs were taken.

Police then launched an appeal for information in the Norwegian media regarding the case. The last time she was seen alive was on 23 November when she checked out of Room 407 of the Hotel Hordaheimen. Staff noted that the woman kept mainly to her room and seemed to be on guard. When she checked out, she paid her bill in cash and requested a taxi. Her movements between then and the discovery of her body remain unknown.

Police were able to decode the notepad entries, and determined that they indicated dates and places the woman had visited. As a result, based on handwritten check-in forms, police determined that the Isdal Woman had travelled around Norway (i.e. Oslo, Trondheim, Stavanger) and Europe (Paris) with at least eight fake passports and aliases. While details such as birthdays and occupations changed from one form to another, she consistently gave her nationality as Belgian; the forms were filled out in either German or French.

It was also learned that the woman had previously stayed at several hotels in Bergen, and was known to change rooms after checking in. She often told hotel staff that she was a travelling saleswoman and antiquities dealer. One witness said that she overheard the woman talking to a man in German in a Bergen hotel. Others who met her mentioned that she also spoke Flemish and broken English and smelled of garlic. People who saw or met her also commented that she wore wigs.

Composite sketches, based on witness descriptions and analysis of her body, were then circulated in many countries via Interpol. Despite the significant police resources deployed, the unknown woman was never identified and the case was quickly closed. While authorities concluded that she had committed suicide by ingestion of sleeping pills, others believe that there is evidence that she was murdered.

Burial 

On 5 February 1971, the woman was given a Catholic burial (based on her use of saints' names on check-in forms) in an unmarked grave within the Møllendal graveyard located in Bergen. Attended by 16 members of the Bergen police force, she was buried in a zinc coffin to both preserve her remains and for ease of disinterment. Her ceremony was also photographed in case relatives came forward at a later date.

Theories 

Many questions remain unanswered about the case, especially the reasons for the woman's many identities and unexplained travel plans. Multiple investigations point to the possibility that she was a spy, given the Cold War context of the time. Norway had also experienced other strange disappearances in the 1960s, close to military installations, which also traced back to international espionage. The declassified records of the Norwegian Armed Forces also reveal that many of the woman's movements seem to correspond to top secret trials of the Penguin missile. A fisherman is also reported to have recognised the unknown woman while observing military movements in Stavanger. The nine identities used in hotels (no passports were found) could imply the involvement of a very professional organization or, alternatively, involvement in a crime gang.

Later developments 
The taxi driver who took the woman from the hotel to Bergen railway station was never found. In 1991, however, a taxi driver wishing to remain anonymous said that after picking up the unknown woman at the hotel, they were joined by another man for the ride to the train station.

In 2005, a Bergen resident, who was 26 in 1970, told a local newspaper that after seeing the sketch circulated, he had suspected that the dead woman was a woman he had seen five days before the body was found, when he was hiking on the hillside at Fløyen. Surprisingly, she was dressed lightly for the city rather than a hike, and was walking ahead of two men wearing coats who looked "southern". She appeared resigned and seemed about to say something to him but did not. He went to someone he knew at the police to report this, but was told to forget about it. Therefore, neither his name nor his alleged sighting was recorded at that time.

In 2016, the case was reopened, and NRK commissioned the American artist Stephen Missal to create six alternative sketches of the Isdal Woman, which were shown to people who had seen her.

In 2017, stable isotope analysis of the woman's teeth (taken from her unburied jawbone) indicated that the woman had been born in about 1930, plus or minus four years, in or near Nuremberg, Germany, but had moved to France or the France–Germany border as a child. This reinforced earlier analysis of her handwriting, which suggested that she had been educated in France or a neighbouring country. Analysis also indicated she had been to a dentist in either East Asia, Central Europe, Southern Europe or South America.

In 2018, NRK and the BBC World Service published a podcast series titled Death in Ice Valley, which included interviews with eyewitnesses and forensic scientists, also suggesting that the Isdal Woman's birthplace may have been southern Germany or the French-German border region, and that she was likely born  1930 (±4 years). She was also likely raised in French-speaking Belgium. In June 2019, the BBC revealed that listeners of the podcast had given some more clues. Further, Colleen Fitzpatrick, a geneticist with the DNA Doe Project, contacted the Death in Ice Valley team to offer her help in identifying the woman through genetic genealogical isotope testing of autopsied tissues.  It has been revealed that she is of mtDNA haplogroup H24, indicating a matrilineal line of descent originating in South East Europe or South West Asia. She also seems to have had a French passport based on the fact that an unidentified French national was registered on one of the flights she took to Norway.

The author Dennis Zacher Aske, in a book about the case, proposed the woman to have been a sex worker. This is based on the way that her route was planned (goal oriented and always returning to the same point, likely her home), her wish to remain anonymous, her behaviour at hotels (including marking the doors in different ways) and the fact that the different men she was witnessed meeting never came forward. He argued that another person was likely at the crime scene when she died, based on evidence from the scene and her medically intoxicated condition in the hours before her death. He said there were arguments that supported the death being either murder or assisted suicide, and believed murder to be most likely.

In 2019, after a publication of an article on the case in Le Républicain Lorrain, an inhabitant of Forbach, France, claimed to have had a relationship with the woman in the summer of 1970. The woman, a polyglot, supposedly had a Balkan accent. She pretended to be about 26 years old but often dressed herself up to look younger, and refused to share any personal details. She is said to have often received scheduled phone calls from abroad. The resident managed to rifle through her belongings and found various wigs and colorful clothes. He had also pilfered a photograph of the woman riding a horse. Suspecting she was a spy, he considered contacting the authorities, but was afraid to do so. His story and the photograph were published in a subsequent issue of the newspaper.

See also 
 Death in Ice Valley
 Tamam Shud case
 Peter Bergmann case
 David Lytton
 Lyle Stevik
 List of unsolved deaths

References

External links 
 Death in Ice Valley – BBC
 
 Osland, Tore, Isdalskvinnen – Operasjon Isotopsy, Bergen 2002 
 Aske, Dennis Zacher. Kvinnen i Isdalen: Nytt lys over norgeshistoriens største krimgåte. Bergen: Vigmostad & Bjørke, 2018. 
 Morgan, David, Isdal Woman – A New Perspective, Northampton 2021 

1930s births
1970 deaths
1970 in Norway
1970 murders in Europe
20th-century German people
20th-century German women
Barbiturates-related deaths
Crime in Norway
Deaths from carbon monoxide poisoning
Drug-related deaths in Norway
Female murder victims
France–Germany border
German expatriates in France
German expatriates in Norway
German people murdered abroad
History of Bergen
Incidents of violence against women
November 1970 events in Europe
People from Nuremberg
People murdered in Norway
Unidentified murder victims
Unsolved deaths
Unsolved murders in Norway
Women in Norway
Violence against women in Norway